Antonio Yao Shun (born 1965) is a Chinese Catholic bishop, and Bishop of the Roman Catholic Diocese of Jining since 2019. Yao is the first Chinese bishop appointed by Pope Francis.

Biography
Yao was born in 1965 in Ulanqab, Inner Mongolia, China. In 1991 he graduated from the National Seminary of Catholic Church in China. He was ordained a priest at that same year. He pursued advanced studies in the United States, earning master's degree of church etiquette from St. John's University. He took part in short-term training at the school of rites of Paul VI in the Philippines. After returning to China he taught at the National Seminary of Catholic Church in China. In 2010 he became vicar general of Bishop John Liu Shi-gong in the Roman Catholic Diocese of Jining. In August 2019 he became Bishop of the Roman Catholic Diocese of Jining.

References

1965 births
Living people
People from Ulanqab
National Seminary of Catholic Church in China alumni
St. John's University (New York City) alumni
21st-century Roman Catholic bishops in China